The Rape of Europa was a mythological event involving Europa. It may also refer to:

Paintings
The Rape of Europa (Titian), a painting of c. 1560–1562 by Titian
The Rape of Europa (Rubens), a painting of 1628–1629 by Peter Paul Rubens after Titian
The Rape of Europa (Reni), a painting of 1637–1639 by Guido Reni
The Rape of Europa (Jordaens), a painting of 1643 by Jacob Jordaens
The Rape of Europa (Goya), a painting of 1772 by Francisco Goya

Other uses
The Rape of Europa (book), a 1994 book about Nazi art theft during World War II